Arkhangelskoye is a rural locality (a selo) and the administrative center of Kamensky District of Tula Oblast, Russia. Population:

References

Notes

Sources

Rural localities in Tula Oblast